Daniel Guérin (19 May 1904, in Paris – 14 April 1988, in Suresnes) was a French libertarian-communist author, best known for his work Anarchism: From Theory to Practice, as well as his collection No Gods No Masters: An Anthology of Anarchism in which he collected writings on the idea and movement it inspired, from the first writings of Max Stirner in the mid-19th century through the first half of the 20th century. He is also known for his opposition to Nazism, fascism, capitalism, imperialism and colonialism, in addition to his support for the Confederación Nacional del Trabajo (CNT) during the Spanish Civil War. His revolutionary defense of free love and homosexuality influenced the development of queer anarchism.

CGT, PSOP, and Libertarian Marxism

Guérin was born into a liberal Parisian family. Early on, he started political activism in the revolutionary syndicalist magazine  of Pierre Monatte. He abandoned university and a literary career in 1926, traveling to Lebanon (1927–1929) and French Indochina (1929–1930) and became a passionate opponent of colonial ventures.

LGBT+ activism
Guérin, a bisexual, offers an insight into the tension sexual minorities among the Left have often experienced. He was a leading figure in the French Left from the 1930s until his death in 1988. He contributed to the homophile journal Arcadie. In 1954, Guérin was widely attacked for his study of the Kinsey Reports in which he also detailed the oppression of homosexuals in France. "The harshest [criticisms] came from Marxists, who tend seriously to underestimate the form of oppression which is antisexual terrorism. I expected it, of course, and I knew that in publishing my book I risked being attacked by those to whom I feel closest on a political level." After coming out in 1965, Guérin was abandoned by the Left, and his papers on sexual liberation were censored or refused publication in left-wing journals. Guérin was involved in the uprising of May 1968, and was a part of the French Gay Liberation movement that emerged after the events. Decades later, Frédéric Martel described Guérin as the "grandfather of the French homosexual movement." Guérin spoke about the extreme hostility toward homosexuality that permeated the left throughout much of the 20th century. "Not so many years ago, to declare oneself a revolutionary and to confess to being homosexual were incompatible," Guérin wrote in 1975.

Works
 Le livre de la dix-huitième année (poèmes), Paris, Albin Michel, 1922
 L'enchantement du Vendredi Saint (roman), Paris, Albin Michel, 1925
 La vie selon la chair (roman), Paris, Albin Michel, 1929
 Fascisme et grand capital. Italie-Allemagne, Paris, Éditions de la révolution prolétarienne, 1936
 English translation by Einde O’ Callaghan Fascism and Big Business.
 La lutte des classes sous la Première République, 1793-1797, Paris, Gallimard, 2 vol., 1946 (édition abrégée : Bourgeois et bras-nus, 1793-1795, 1968)
 Où va le peuple américain ?, Paris, Julliard, 2 vol., 1950-1951
 Au service des colonisés, Paris, Éditions de Minuit, 1954
 Kinsey et la sexualité, Paris, Julliard, 1955
 Les Antilles décolonisées, préface d'Aimé Césaire, Paris, Présence Africaine, 1956
 Trois problèmes de la Révolution, 1958 essay 
 English translation by Paul Sharkey: "Three Problems of the Revolution"
 Jeunesse du socialisme libertaire, Paris, Rivière, 1959
 Shakespeare et Gide en correctionnelle ?, Paris, Editions du Scorpion, 1959
 Le grain sous la neige, adaptation théâtrale d'après Ignazio Silone, Éditions Mondiales, 1961
 Vautrin, adaptation théâtrale d'après Honoré de Balzac, Paris, La Plume d'or, 1962
 Eux et lui, illustré par André Masson, Monaco, Editions du Rocher, 1962
 Essai sur la révolution sexuelle après Reich et Kinsey, Paris, Belfond, 1963
 Front Populaire, révolution manquée ?, Paris, Julliard, 1963
 Décolonisation du noir américain, Paris, Présence Africaine, 1963
 L'Algérie qui se cherche, Paris, Présence Africaine, 1964
 Un jeune homme excentrique. Essai d'autobiographie, Paris, Julliard, 1965
 Sur le fascisme : I- La peste brune ; II- Fascisme et grand capital, Paris, Maspero, 1965 (réédition)
 L'anarchisme. De la doctrine à l'action, Paris, Gallimard, 1965
 English translation by Mary Klopper: Anarchism: From Theory to Practice, with an introduction by Noam Chomsky, New York: Monthly Review Press, 1970
 Ni Dieu ni maître. Histoire et anthologie de l'anarchie, Paris, Éditions de Delphes, 1965
 Pour un marxisme libertaire, Paris, Laffont, 1969
 Rosa Luxembourg et la spontanéité révolutionnaire, Paris, Flammarion, 1971
 Autobiographie de jeunesse. D'une dissidence sexuelle au socialisme, Paris, Belfond, 1972
 De l'Oncle Tom aux Panthères Noires, Paris, UGE, 1973 (réédition : Les Bons Caractères, 2010)
 Les assassins de Ben Barka. Dix ans d'enquête, Paris, Guy Authier, 1975
 La Révolution française et nous, Paris, Maspero, 1976
 Proudhon oui et non, Paris, Gallimard, 1978
 Homosexualité et révolution, Paris, Le vent du ch'min, 1983

References

Further reading

External links
DanielGuerin.info Designed by activists, researchers and relatives, this site is dedicated to the life and works of Daniel Guerin
Anarchist Archives
Anarchism: From Theory to Practice
Daniel Guérin Archive at marxists.org
The Anarchist Writings of Daniel Guerin
 Full text at the Internet Archive

1904 births
1988 deaths
20th-century French essayists
Anarcho-communists
Bisexual men
Bisexual politicians
French bisexual writers
Economics writers
French anarchists
French anti-capitalists
French anti-fascists
French communists
20th-century French historians
French male essayists
French male writers
French Marxist historians
French people of the Spanish Civil War
French Section of the Workers' International politicians
French socialists
French Trotskyists
Historians of anarchism
Historians of communism
Historians of fascism
Historians of France
Historians of Russia
Historians of Nazism
Historians of the French Revolution
French LGBT rights activists
Libertarian Marxists
Libertarian socialists
Marxist theorists
Political science writers
Unified Socialist Party (France) politicians
Workers and Peasants' Socialist Party politicians
Writers from Paris
French people of World War II